Catonia may refer to:
 Catonia (planthopper), a genus of planthoppers in the family Achilidae
 Catonia, a genus of plants in the family Melastomataceae, synonym of Miconia
 Catonia, a genus of plants in the family Symplocaceae, synonym of Symplocos